Douglas Arthur Smith (11 February 1924 – 15 October 1972) was a British radio announcer and comedian who spent 25 years with the BBC. He began his broadcasting career with the BBC European Service (now the World Service) in 1946 and later worked as an announcer and newsreader on the Home Service and the Third Programme. He is probably best remembered as the formal announcer on Beyond Our Ken (1958–1964), its successor Round the Horne (1965–1968) and the short-lived Stop Messing About (1969–1970), where his "BBC accent" was used to comic effect. In this role, he advertised Dobbiroids (a fictional product for horses) and the huge number of naïve sound effects he made to assist in the development of humorous and often bizarre plots. Smith performed "Nobody Loves a Fairy When She's Forty" in an episode of Round the Horne. Many of his roles were portrayals of inanimate objects, e.g., volcanoes, "and I, Douglas Smith, play the part of the volcano", and "I, Douglas Smith, in my most taxing role to date, play the part of the world." (spoof on 'Around the World in 80 Days').

A Croydonian, he died aged 48 in Kingston upon Thames.

References

1924 births
1972 deaths
British male comedians
British male radio actors
BBC people
20th-century British comedians
People from Croydon